Leebotwood is a civil parish in Shropshire, England.  It contains twelve listed buildings that are recorded in the National Heritage List for England.  Of these, two are at Grade II*, the middle of the three grades, and the others are at Grade II, the lowest grade.  The parish contains the village of Leebotwood and the surrounding countryside.  Most of the listed buildings are houses, cottages, farmhouses and farm buildings, many of which are timber framed.  The other listed buildings are a church, a public house, and a war memorial.


Key

Buildings

References

Citations

Sources

Lists of buildings and structures in Shropshire